Texas John Slaughter (formally titled: Tales of Texas John Slaughter) is a western television series which aired seventeen episodes between October 31, 1958 and April 23, 1961, as part of The Wonderful World of Disney, starring Tom Tryon in the title role.  The character was based upon an actual historical figure, Texas Ranger John Horton Slaughter.  Tryon memorably wore an enormous white cowboy hat with the brim pinned up in the front as part of his wardrobe for the series.  Narration is provided by Paul Frees.

The beginning theme song for the series includes the line "Texas John Slaughter made 'em do what they oughta, and if they didn't, they died."

Episodes

Background

Guest stars

Release
The series was originally broadcast as segments of The Wonderful World of Disney.

The series appeared in re-runs on the Disney Channel's classic program block "Disney Drive-In" which was later known as "Vault Disney".

Merchandising

The TV show was also adapted into a comic book by Dan Spiegle, distributed by Dell Comics.

References

External links

1950s Western (genre) television series
1960s Western (genre) television series
Television series by Disney
1958 American television series debuts
1961 American television series endings
1950s American drama television series
1960s American drama television series
Black-and-white American television shows
Television shows set in Texas
Television shows adapted into comics
Television series about the Texas Ranger Division